Kenneth Roy Good (born 28 September 1941) is an English Anglican priest.

Early life
The son of Isaac Edward Good and Florence Helen née White, he was educated at Stamford School and King's College, London.

Religious life
Good was ordained deacon in 1967, and priest in 1968. After a curacy in Stockton on Tees he was with the Missions to Seamen from 1970 to 1985, serving in Antwerp, Kobe and London. He was Vicar of Nunthorpe from, 1985 to 1993; Rural Dean of Stokesley from 1989 to 1993, and Archdeacon of Richmond from 1993 to 2006.

References

1941 births
Archdeacons of Richmond
Alumni of King's College London
Living people
People educated at Stamford School
Anglican chaplains